Askham is a village and civil parish in the Bassetlaw district of Nottinghamshire, England, about six miles south-east of East Retford.  According to the 2001 census it had a population of 183, decreasing slightly to 181 at the 2011 Census.

St Nicholas' Church is Norman, restored in 1906–07.

See also
Listed buildings in Askham, Nottinghamshire

References

External links
 
 Aerial photo of Askham with notes
 Photos of Askham
 

Villages in Nottinghamshire
Civil parishes in Nottinghamshire
Bassetlaw District